Sandro Manoel dos Santos or simply Sandro Manoel (born 23 July 1988) is a Brazilian footballer plays for Al-Arabi as a defensive midfielder.

He made his professional debut for Cruzeiro. The result was a 0-1 home defeat to Rio Branco-MG. This took place on 13 March 2008 in the Minas Gerais State Championship.

Honours
Santa Cruz
Campeonato Pernambucano: 2012, 2013
Campeonato Brasileiro Série C: 2013

Al-Taawoun FC
 Kings Cup (Saudi Arabia): 2019

External links
 ogol
 Soccerway

References

1988 births
Living people
Brazilian footballers
Brazilian expatriate footballers
Clube Náutico Capibaribe players
Cruzeiro Esporte Clube players
Marília Atlético Clube players
Ipatinga Futebol Clube players
Esporte Clube Democrata players
Nacional Esporte Clube (MG) players
Santa Cruz Futebol Clube players
Ceará Sporting Club players
Al-Taawoun FC players
Al-Fateh SC players
Al Ahli SC (Doha) players
Al-Arabi SC (Saudi Arabia) players
Campeonato Brasileiro Série B players
Campeonato Brasileiro Série C players
Saudi Professional League players
Qatar Stars League players
Saudi First Division League players
Expatriate footballers in Saudi Arabia
Expatriate footballers in Qatar
Brazilian expatriate sportspeople in Saudi Arabia
Brazilian expatriate sportspeople in Qatar
Association football midfielders
Sportspeople from Recife